Howard Sylvester Lohr (June 3, 1892 – June 9, 1977) was a Major League Baseball outfielder who played for two seasons. He played for the Cincinnati Reds in 1914 and the Cleveland Indians in 1916.

External links

1892 births
1977 deaths
Major League Baseball outfielders
Baseball players from Pennsylvania
Cincinnati Reds players
Cleveland Indians players